William Lee was launched in 1831 in Hull as a whaler in the Northern Whale Fishery. Her owners sold her in 1836 after six whaling voyages and she traded more widely, to Russia, Calcutta, and North America. She was wrecked in December 1847.

Career
William Lee first appeared in Lloyd's Register (LR) in 1831.

William Lee then made six annual voyages to Davis Strait for her owners, Messrs. Lee and Tall, of Hull. The following data is from Coltish:

After two disappointing seasons of whale hunting, William Lees owners offered William Lee for sale on 5 December 1836.

In late 1837 William Lee took a cargo that included cotton from New Orleans and sailed for St Petersburh. She stopped at Elsinore where the Danish authorities insisted that the cotton go into quarantine for 40 days. The Danish Customs had received notice that yellow fever had broken out in New Orleans. Captain Shepherd presented documents that showed that the cotton had left New Orleans months before the notice, and that it had passed through Liverpool without incident. He left the cotton with Customs, which pocketed a fee of £1000 for the expense of holding it, and proceeded on to Petersburg. A vessel flying the Russian flag that also was carrying cotton from the same shipment from New Orleans was permitted to proceed. The newspaper report suggested that the difference in treatment was due to there being a Russian representative on the Danish customs board.

The opening in 1836 of the Hull Flax and Cotton Mill subsequently led her owners to send William Lee on several voyages to Calcutta.

Fate
William Lee, Captain Thomas Sykes, was driven ashore and damaged on 5 December 1847 on Öland, near Åkerby, Sweden. She was on a voyage from Saint Petersburg to Hull, with a cargo of deals, lathes, and battens. The crew were saved. 

She was refloated on 10 December and taken in to "Egvaag".

Citations & references
Citations

References

External links
 

1831 ships
Whaling ships
Age of Sail merchant ships of England
Maritime incidents in December 1847